Flight 230 may refer to:

Aeroméxico Flight 230, crashed on 27 July 1981
TAT Flight 230, crashed on 4 March 1988

0230